Sheikh Shawkat Hossain Nilu (3 April 1952 – 7 May 2017) was a Bangladeshi politician and chairman of the National People's Party.

Early life 
Nilu was born on 3 April 1952 into the Sheikh family of Tungipara in Gopalganj District. His father was Sheikh Shahadat Hossain.

Career 
Nilu joined Bangladesh Students' Union in the 1960s. He was the founding Agriculture Secretary of the Bangladesh Nationalist Party. He served as the Student Affairs Secretary to General Ziaur Rahman. He was the Secretary General of the Jatiyatabadi Krishak Dal, the farmers' unit of the Bangladesh Nationalist Party.

He led the Progressive Nationalist Party (Progatishil Jatiyabadi Dal) which merged into the Jatiya Party, after Hussain Mohammad Ershad came to power and became a presidium member. He was the head of the Krishak Party, the farmers' unit of the Jatiya Party. He left the Jatiya Party in 2008 and formed the National Peoples' Party. His party entering into an alliance with the Bangladesh Nationalist Party.

In September 2014, he was expelled from the Bangladesh Nationalist Party led alliance after he attended an event at the Gonobhaban hosted by Prime Minister Sheikh Hasina. In response, he created his own alliance, National Democratic Front, with 10 ideologically similar political parties. He was made Secretary General of the alliance.

Death 
Nilu died on 7 May 2017 in Square Hospital, Dhaka, Bangladesh. He was buried in the Banani graveyard.

References 

Jatiya Party politicians
Bangladesh Nationalist Party politicians
2017 deaths
9th Jatiya Sangsad members
Sheikh Mujibur Rahman family
1952 births